The High Commissioner of Niue to New Zealand is the top-ranking diplomatic representative of Niue to New Zealand. Niue is in free association with New Zealand and lacks full sovereignty. New Zealand is the only country in the world in which Niue exchanges diplomatic representation.

This office was established in 2001; Hima Takelesi was appointed the first Niue High Commissioner to New Zealand, after resigning from the Niue Assembly in August 2001.

References

 
New Zealand and the Commonwealth of Nations
Niue and the Commonwealth of Nations
New Zealand
Niue